Jazz poet may refer to:

Jazz Poet, a 1989 album by Tommy Flanagan
Jazz poetry, a form of poetry